Against Their Will... The History and Geography of Forced Migrations in the USSR is a historical research book by Pavel Polyan (2001), published by the Memorial society. It is the first comprehensive study of all massive-scale forced migrations within the Soviet Union. The book is based on published materials and archival data made public. It contains a large number of summary tables.

References

External links
 The book online, on the site of Memorial
 Against Their Will: The History and Geography of Forced Migrations in the USSR Partial preview of the book at Google Book Search

2001 non-fiction books
History books about the Soviet Union
Books about Soviet repression
Forced migration in the Soviet Union
21st-century history books
Works about post–World War II forced migrations
Works about internal migrations